Messier 13 or M13, also designated NGC 6205 and sometimes called the Great Globular Cluster in Hercules or the Hercules Globular Cluster, is a globular cluster of several hundred thousand stars in the constellation of Hercules.

Discovery and visibility
M13 was discovered by Edmond Halley in 1714, and cataloged by Charles Messier on June 1, 1764, into his list of objects not to mistake for comets; Messier's list, including Messier 13, eventually became known as the Messier Catalog.

About one third of the way from Vega to Arcturus, four bright stars in Herculēs form the Keystone asterism, the broad torso of the hero. M13 can be seen in this asterism  of the way north (by west) from Zeta to Eta Herculis. Although only telescopes with great light-gathering capability fully resolve the stars of the cluster, M13 may be visible to the naked eye depending on circumstances. With a low-power telescope, Messier 13 looks like a comet or fuzzy patch. The cluster is visible throughout the year from latitudes greater than 36 degrees north, with the longest visibility during Northern Hemisphere spring and summer.

It is located at right ascension 16h 41.7m, declination +36° 28'. With an apparent magnitude of 5.8, it is barely visible with the naked eye on clear nights. Its diameter is about 23 arcminutes and it is readily viewable in small telescopes. Nearby is NGC 6207, a 12th-magnitude edge-on galaxy that lies 28 arcminutes directly northeast. A small galaxy, IC 4617, lies halfway between NGC 6207 and M13, north-northeast of the large globular cluster's center.

In traditional binoculars, the Hercules Globular Cluster appears as a round patch of light. At least four inches of telescope aperture resolves stars in M13's outer extent as small pinpoints of light. However, only larger telescopes resolve stars further into the center of the cluster.

Characteristics
About 145 light-years in diameter, M13 is composed of several hundred thousand stars, the brightest of which is a red giant, the variable star V11, also known as V1554 Herculis, with an apparent visual magnitude of 11.95. M13 is 22,200–25,000 light-years away from Earth, and the globular cluster is one of over one hundred that orbit the center of the Milky Way.

Single stars in this globular cluster were first resolved in 1779. Compared to the stars in the neighborhood of the Sun, the stars of the M13 population are more than a hundred times more densely packed. They are so close together that they sometimes collide and produce new stars. The newly formed, young stars, so-called "blue stragglers", are particularly interesting to astronomers.

The 1974 Arecibo message, which contained encoded information about the human race, DNA, atomic numbers, Earth's position and other information, was beamed from the Arecibo Observatory radio telescope towards M13 as an experiment in contacting potential extraterrestrial civilizations in the cluster. The cluster will move through space during the transit time; opinions differ as to whether or not the cluster will be in a position to receive the message by the time that it arrives.

The last two variables (V63 and V64) were discovered from Spain in April 2021 and March 2022 respectively.

Literary references
 The science fiction novellas "Sucker Bait" by Isaac Asimov and the novel  Question and Answer by Poul Anderson take place on Troas, a world within M13.
 In the German science fiction series Perry Rhodan, M13 is the location of Arkon, the homeworld of the race of Arkonides.
 In author Dan Simmons' Hyperion Cantos the Hercules cluster is where a copy of Earth was secretly recreated after the original was destroyed.
 In his novel The Sirens of Titan, Kurt Vonnegut writes "Every passing hour brings the Solar System forty-three thousand miles closer to Globular Cluster M13 in Hercules—and still there are some misfits who insist that there is no such thing as progress."
 Deliberately engineering a star in Messier 13 to go nova was part of the Cybermen's complicated plot in the 1968 Doctor Who story The Wheel in Space.
 In Bill Amend's popular comic strip FoxTrot, Jason Fox mentions observing the M13 Globular Cluster.

Gallery

See also
 List of globular clusters
 Lists of astronomical objects
 List of Messier objects
 New General Catalogue

References

External links

 Messier 13, SEDS Messier pages
 Red Giant variable stars
 L199 (V63), a new variable star in M13
 Variability of L261 in M13 (V64)
 Messier 13, Galactic Globular Clusters Database page
 Messier 13, High-resolution LRGB image based on 2 hrs total exposure
 Messier 13, Amateur astrophotographer (hgg) photo using the 9.25" Celestron Telescope (85min exposure)
 M13 Hercules Globular photo detail Dark Atmospheres
   Variable Stars in M13. II.The Red Variables and the Globular Cluster Period-Luminosity Relation
Variable Stars in M13. III. The Cepheid Variables and their Relation to Evolutionary Changes in Metal-Poor BL Her Stars.
 Messier 13, Image by Waid Observatory
 NightSkyInfo.com – M13, the Hercules Globular Cluster
 Photometric study of the V2 cepheid in M13
  Period, Amplitude and Light Curve of V38 in M13
 Great Globular Cluster in Hercules (Messier 13/NGC 6205)
 
 

Messier 013
Messier 013
013
Milky Way
Messier 013
?